Polish Woman is an oil on panel painting in the National Museum, Warsaw, historically attributed to the French Rococo artist Jean-Antoine Watteau. The painting correlates to a presumably lost drawing by Watteau that is now known via François Boucher's etching published in 1726 as part of the Recueil Jullienne. Given that the painting is not signed, its attribution and dating remains uncertain; various authors either accept or reject the painting as a Watteau, dating it from the early 1710s to the early 1730s. 

Polish Woman forms a single-figure, full-length composition that depicts a young woman standing amid a landscape, dressed in somewhat an exotic attire, consisting of long red gown with fur garment and white bonnet; it is a recurring subject that is also present in numerous paintings and drawings by Watteau such as The Coquettes and The Dreamer. Numerous authors thought the attire to be related to the so-called "Polish" fashion that was said to be present in France during Watteau's lifetime, hence the traditional naming is derived; there were also attempts to identify the sitter of the painting, who was notably thought to be Watteau's contemporary, the Comédie-Française actress Charlotte Desmares.

During World War II, the painting was seized into the collection of the prominent Nazi politician Hermann Göring, before being restored into Polish property upon the war's conclusion.

Gallery

Notes

References

Bibliography

External links
 Polish Woman at the dMuseion, a project of the National Museum in Warsaw
 Polka (La femme polonaise) at Europeana

1710s paintings
1720s paintings
Paintings in the collection of the National Museum, Warsaw
Paintings by Antoine Watteau
Portraits of women